Bondo Territory is a territory in the Bas-Uele Province of the Democratic Republic of the Congo. The administrative capital is the town of Bondo.

Location

The territory borders Central African Republic to the north and west, Ango Territory to the east, Buta Territory to the southeast, Aketi Territory to the south and Yakoma Territory in Nord-Ubangi District to the southwest. Rivers include the Duma River, the Bomu River, which flows along the Central African Republican border, Ngwane River, Aso River, Dume River and the Uere River.

Subdivisions
The territory contains the following chiefdoms:

Biamange Chiefdom
Boso Chiefdom
Deni Chiefdom
Duaru Chiefdom
Gama Chiefdom
Gaya Chiefdom
Goa Chiefdom
Kasa Chiefdom
Mobenge-Mondila Chiefdom
Soa Chiefdom

References

Territories of Bas-Uélé Province